The Wicker Apartments, now known as the Bellevue Apartments, are a historic apartment complex at 3905-4213 Chamberlain Avenue and 4210-4232 Old Brook Road in Richmond, Virginia.  It is a well-preserved example of a garden apartment complex developed in the post-World War II years (1945–47) with funding support from the Federal Housing Administration.  The complex includes sixteen two-story brick buildings with 144 housing units, set on spacious and handsomely landscaped property.

The complex was listed on the National Register of Historic Places in 2016.

See also
National Register of Historic Places listings in Richmond, Virginia

References

Residential buildings on the National Register of Historic Places in Virginia
Colonial Revival architecture in Virginia
Residential buildings completed in 1945
Buildings and structures in Richmond, Virginia
National Register of Historic Places in Richmond, Virginia